This article presents a list of administrative divisions of Ukraine sorted by their gross regional product (GRP) per capita. GRP is the regional counterpart of the national gross domestic product (GDP), the most comprehensive measure of national economic activity.

GRP per capita (nominal) 2004-2020

See also
 List of Ukrainian oblasts and territories by salary
 List of Ukrainian regions by Human Development Index
 List of Ukrainian subdivisions by GRP

References

GDP
Economy of Ukraine-related lists
Ukrainian, GDP per capita